Paul Steven Ripley (January 1, 1950 – January 3, 2019) was an American recording artist, record producer, songwriter, studio engineer, guitarist, and inventor. He entered the music industry in 1977. He was also the leader/producer of country rock band The Tractors.

Early life and education
Ripley was born in Boise, Idaho, but grew up in Oklahoma: he attended Glencoe High School in Glencoe, Oklahoma, and graduated from Oklahoma State University.

Career
Ripley's band Moses chose the name Red Dirt Records for their 1972 self-published live album; the first usage of Red Dirt. 

Ripley worked as a studio musician, producer, and recording engineer, working with Bob Dylan, playing guitar (on Shot of Love) and on the "Shot of Love" tour, with J. J. Cale (on Shades, 8 and Roll On), and he produced Clarence "Gatemouth" Brown and Roy Clark (on Makin' Music) and Johnnie Lee Wills (on Reunion) and 20/20 (on “Sex Trap”). Dylan listed Ripley as one of his favorite guitarists.

In 1982, Ripley founded Ripley Guitars in Burbank, California. He created guitars for Steve Lukather, J. J. Cale, John Hiatt, Ry Cooder, Jimmy Buffett and Eddie Van Halen, before moving to Tulsa in 1987 and buying Leon Russell's former recording studio, The Church Studio. 

In 1994 he formed the country band, The Tractors. He is the co-writer of the country hit "Baby Likes to Rock It".

In 2002, he created his own record label (Boy Rocking Records) to produce artists including The Tractors, Leon Russell and The Red Dirt Rangers. In 2009, he produced and hosted a 20-part radio series on the history of Oklahoma rock and roll, that aired on Oklahoma public radio stations. It was entitled "Oklahoma Rock and Roll with Steve Ripley." In 2013 Ripley produced the album Lone Chimney by the Red Dirt Rangers.

Ripley was inducted into the Oklahoma Music Awards Red Dirt Hall of Fame along with Bob Childers and Tom Skinner at the ceremony for the First Annual Red Dirt Music Awards held on Sunday, November 9, 2003 at Cain's Ballroom in Tulsa. 

In 2015, Ripley worked alongside staff at the Oklahoma Historical Society to create a "Church Studio" exhibit space at the Oklahoma History Center.  He remastered several of Leon Russell's songs that were available in a touchscreen kiosk that allowed a visitor to adjust individual instruments and vocal tracks to comprehend how multitrack recording works.

In 2016 Ripley produced and curated a concert at Cain's Ballroom to celebrate the music and legacy of Bob Dylan.

After his death in 2020 Ripley was inducted into the Oklahoma Historians Hall of Fame by the Oklahoma Historical Society  and also received the Restless Spirit Award from the Red Dirt Relief Fund.

Death
Ripley died from cancer on January 3, 2019, two days after his 69th birthday, at his home in Pawnee, Oklahoma.

Discography

The Tractors
 1994 : The Tractors (Arista)
 1995 : Have Yourself a Tractors Christmas (Arista)
 1998 : Farmers in a Changing World (Arista)
 2001 : Fast Girl (Boy Rocking)
 2002 : The Big Night (Boy Rocking)
 2005 : The Kids Record (Boy Rocking)
 2009 : Trade Union (Boy Rocking)
 2020 : Tulsa (Boy Rocking)

Solo discography
 2002 : Ripley (Boy Rocking Records) with The Jordanaires

Incidental music
 1976: "Flying Upside Down in My Plane" (part of the soundtrack in the film, Deportee)

References

External links
 The Tractors official website
 AllMusic Credits
 Voices of Oklahoma interview. First person interview conducted in 2018 with Steve Ripley.

1950 births
2019 deaths
Guitar makers
American male singers
American country singers
American country songwriters
American country guitarists
American male guitarists
Record producers from Idaho
Deaths from cancer in Oklahoma
Oklahoma State University alumni
The Tractors members
Singers from Idaho
Singers from Oklahoma
Musicians from Boise, Idaho
People from Payne County, Oklahoma
Guitarists from Oklahoma
20th-century American guitarists
Country musicians from Oklahoma
20th-century American male musicians